Indoseiulus is a genus of mites in the Phytoseiidae family.

Species
 Indoseiulus duanensis Liang & Zeng, 1992
 Indoseiulus eharai Gupta, 1986
 Indoseiulus ghaiae Denmark & Kolodochka, 1993
 Indoseiulus irregularis (Evans, 1953)
 Indoseiulus liturivorus (Ehara, 1982)
 Indoseiulus ricini (Ghai & Menon, 1969)
 Indoseiulus semirregularis (Schicha & Corpuz-Raros, 1992)

References

Phytoseiidae